Vasyutino is a rural locality (a village) in Prigorodnoye Rural Settlement, Sokolsky District, Vologda Oblast, Russia. The population was 143 as of 2002.

Geography 
Vasyutino is located 13 km southeast of Sokol (the district's administrative centre) by road. Litega is the nearest rural locality.

References 

Rural localities in Sokolsky District, Vologda Oblast